Achillides, the peacock swallowtails, are a subgenus within the genus Papilio containing 25 species.

Species 
 Papilio arcturus Westwood, 1842 – blue peacock
 Papilio bianor Cramer, [1777] – Chinese peacock
 Papilio blumei Boisduval, 1836 – green swallowtail 
 Papilio buddha Westwood, 1872 – Malabar banded peacock
 Papilio chikae Igarashi, 1965 – Luzon peacock swallowtail
 Papilio crino Fabricius, 1793 – common banded peacock
 Papilio dialis Leech, 1893 – southern Chinese peacock
 Papilio doddsi Janet, 1896
 Papilio elephenor  Doubleday, 1845 – yellow-crested spangle 
 Papilio hermeli Nuyda, 1992
 Papilio hoppo Matsumura, 1908
 Papilio karna C. & R. Felder, 1864
 Papilio krishna Moore, 1857 – Krishna peacock
 Papilio longimacula Z.G. Wang & Y. Niu, 2002 
 Papilio lorquinianus C. Felder & R. Felder, 1865 - sea green swallowtail
 Papilio maackii Ménétriés, 1859
 Papilio montrouzieri Boisduval, 1859
 Papilio neumoegeni Honrath, 1890
 Papilio palinurus Fabricius, 1787
 Papilio paris Linnaeus, 1758 – Paris peacock 
 Papilio peranthus Fabricius, 1787
 Papilio pericles Wallace, 1865
 Papilio polyctor Boisduval, 1836 – common peacock
 Papilio syfanius Oberthür, 1886
 Papilio ulysses Linnaeus, 1758 - blue mountain butterfly

References 

 , 2000: New species, new subspecies, and new record of butterflies (Lepidoptera: Papilionidae) from China (II). Entomotaxonomia 22(4): 266-274.
 , 1993: A new subspecies of Achillides form Indonesia (Lepidoptera: Papilionidae). Futao 12: 17.
 , 1997: A new subspecies of Achillides from Yapen Is., Indonesia (Lepidoptera : Papilionidae). Futao 24: 25-27.
 , 1992: Zwei neue taxa der gattung Papilio Linnaeus, 1758 aus Indonesien. (Lepidoptera: Papilionidae). Entomologische Zeitschrift 102 (16): 289-304.
 , 2002: New species of butterflies (Lepidoptera) from China, II. Entomotaxonomia 2002 (4): 276-284.
 , 1998: Schmetterlinge der Erde, Butterflies of the world Part I (1), Papilionidae Papilionidae I: Papilio, Subgenus Achillides, Bhutanitis, Teinopalpus. Edited by Erich Bauer and Thomas Frankenbach. Keltern : Goecke & Evers ; Canterbury : Hillside Books  for Papilio doddsi Janet, 1896